This is a chronological list of mayors of Varna, the third largest city of Bulgaria, since that post was established after the Liberation of Bulgaria in 1878.

References
Mayors of Varna. Varna municipal website, accessed 4 April 2006.

See also
 List of mayors of Sofia
 List of mayors of Plovdiv
 List of mayors of Pleven

Varna